Ethel Rosalie Glover (1857–1917) was an English pianist, composer and music critic.

Life 
Ethel Rosalie Harraden was born in Islington, Middlesex, England, in 1857, the daughter of Samuel Harraden, a London/Calcutta agent, and studied at the Royal Academy of Music. After completing her studies, she worked as a pianist and composer. She married Frank Glover and settled in Leamington Spa. Harraden became interested in composing for the stage, sometimes collaborating with her brother Herbert Harraden. She reviewed for the Leamington Spa Courier, a newspaper owned by her husband. She died in 1917 at age sixty at Leamington Spa, England.

Works
Harraden composed mostly ballads and stage music. Her works include:

Two Melodies
Tristesse for Cello and Piano (1886, Schott Music)
I go to prove my soul (Text: Robert Browning) (c. 1884)
The Rainy Day (Text: Henry Wadsworth Longfellow)
Pearl, cantata
His Last Chance, operetta (1890)
The Lady in Pink, operetta (1891)
The Taboo, opera fantastie (1895)

References

External links
 
 The Rainy Day, score at Victorian Voices archive

1857 births
1917 deaths
19th-century classical composers
20th-century classical composers
English classical composers
British women classical composers
English opera composers
People from Islington (district)
Alumni of the Royal Academy of Music
20th-century English composers
19th-century English musicians
Women opera composers
20th-century English women musicians
19th-century British composers
20th-century women composers
19th-century women composers